Clarence Lester "Dude" Lytle (December 22, 1879 - March 4, 1937) was an American baseball pitcher in the pre-Negro leagues. He played from 1901 to 1911 with various teams. He played mostly with the Chicago Union Giants.

In 1907, Lytle signed with the new St. Paul Colored Gophers team. Later that year, a 1907 St. Paul newspaper paper noted that Lytle and fellow St. Paul Colored Gophers pitcher Johnny Davis both had No-hitter games to their credit.

Lytle died in Chicago, Illinois, on March 4, 1937, at the age of 57.

References

External links
Baseball statistics and player information from Baseball-Reference Black Baseball Stats and Seamheads

1879 births
1937 deaths
Leland Giants players
St. Paul Colored Gophers players
20th-century African-American people
Baseball outfielders